Three Mile Island: Thirty Minutes to Meltdown is a 1982 book by Daniel Ford.  Ford presents a "meticulous post-mortem of the events that nearly led to a meltdown" at the Metropolitan Edison station near Harrisburg in March 1979. He analyses the complex of people, technology, customs and regulations involved. Ford identifies regulatory failure and industry cost-cutting as the underlying causes of the Three Mile Island accident. 

Daniel Ford is an economist and former director of the Union of Concerned Scientists.

See also
List of books about nuclear issues
The Cult of the Atom
Three Mile Island: A Nuclear Crisis in Historical Perspective
Three Mile Island accident health effects
Robert Del Tredici

References

Nuclear power in the United States
1982 non-fiction books
Books about politics of the United States
Books about nuclear issues
Three Mile Island accident